Invasion Fest is an all-ages heavy metal music festival held primarily in Melbourne, and occasionally in other major cities around Australia. It showcases smaller and emerging Australian bands within the heavy scene that wouldn't normally have the opportunity to play such large shows or venues, alongside larger international and Australian acts.

2012
The initial year of Invasion Fest had 2 events, one in February and one in November. The February event was held at Ringwood OLP, and the November event was held at the Lilydale Showgrounds shed.

Lineups

Saturday, 25 February
 Lovers Grave
 Hallower
 The Storm Picturesque
 Glorified
 Saviour
 Belle Haven
 The Ocean The Sky
 Anchored
 Storm the Sky
 Graveyard
 Surrender

Sunday, 25 November
 Dream On, Dreamer
 Northlane
 Make Them Suffer
 In Fear and Faith (US)
 The Bride
 Saviour
 Prepared Like a Bride
 Belle Haven
 Thorns
 Exposures

2013
In 2013, the festival expanded to include the Gold Coast, albeit with a slightly different lineup to the Melbourne event. The Melbourne event was held at St Johns Parish in Mitcham, and the Gold Coast event was held at Expressive Grounds. The Melbourne event was the first show for the band Sentinel, and the final show for the band Brooklyn.

Lineups

Melbourne 
Saturday, 14 September
 For the Fallen Dreams (US)  
 The Plot in You (US)
 Hand of Mercy
 Storm the Sky
 Fit for a King (US)
 Brooklyn
 Glorified
 Belle Haven
 Graveyards
 Sierra
 Jack the Stripper
 I, Valiance
 The Evercold
 Left For Wolves
 Sentinel

Gold Coast 
Sunday, 22 September
 Northlane
 For the Fallen Dreams (US)  
 The Plot in You (US)
 Hand of Mercy
 Saviour
 Aversions Crown
 Storm the Sky
 Fit for a King (US)
 The Lane Cove
 Emerald Vale
 Hand of the Architect
 Take Us to Vegas

Notes
*A For the Fallen Dreams withdrew from the lineup due to vocalist Chad Ruhlig suffering a motorcycle accident.

2015
After skipping a year, Invasion Fest returned to a single event format in Melbourne for 2015. The event was held at Arrow on Swanston, and sponsored by KillYourStereo.com.

Lineup
Saturday, 5 December

2016
The 2016 event was held at Arrow on Swanston. This was the final show for the band Sentinel.

Lineup
Saturday, 10 December

2017
The 2017 event was held at Arrow on Swanston, and sponsored by KillYourStereo.com and Hysteria Magazine.

Lineup
Saturday, 9 December

2020
After a 2 year hiatus, the festival returned in 2020 and was held at The Metro Theatre in Sydney, rather than Melbourne. It was once again sponsored by Hysteria Magazine. This was The Red Shore's first performance in over a decade.

Lineup

References

Heavy metal festivals in Australia